Chuqi Sillani (Aymara chuqi gold, silla cane of maize, -ni a suffix, "the one with the golden cane of maize", also spelled Chuquisillani) is a  mountain in the Bolivian Andes. It is located in the La Paz Department, Aroma Province, Sica Sica Municipality, and in the Loayza Province, Luribay Municipality.

References 

Mountains of La Paz Department (Bolivia)